Fiamma Smith (born 23 April 1962) is a Guatemalan alpine skier. She competed in three events at the 1988 Winter Olympics.

References

1962 births
Living people
Guatemalan female alpine skiers
Olympic alpine skiers of Guatemala
Alpine skiers at the 1988 Winter Olympics
Place of birth missing (living people)